Küstner is a German-language surname. Notable people with the surname include:

 Heinz Küstner (1897—1963), German gynecologist and obstetrician
 Joachim Küstner, guitarist for Dark Assault
 Karl Friedrich Küstner (1856−1936), German astronomer
 Otto Küstner (1849−1931), German gynecologist

German-language surnames